The Long Island Stakes is an American Thoroughbred horse race held annually in November at Aqueduct Racetrack, in Ozone Park, Queens, New York. The race is for fillies and mares, age three and up, willing to race the one and one-half miles on the turf.

Formerly a Grade II event, the race was downgraded to Grade III status in 2007.

Historical notes

The original Long Island Handicap was established in 1894 at Sheepshead Bay Race Track in Sheepshead Bay, Brooklyn, New York. The race was open to horses of either gender age three and older and run on dirt over a distance of one mile and one furlong. It was last run in 1910 when the racetrack closed as a result of anti-gambling legislation.

A second edition of the Long Island Handicap was inaugurated in 1956 at Belmont Park. Through 1971 the race was open to horses of either gender, age three and older. It was hosted by Belmont Park in 1956–1960, 1962, 1964–1965, 1968–1969, 1972, 1975–1977, and 1989–1993.

Prior to 2017, the Long Island was run under handicap weights. Since then, the New York Racing Association has run the race under allowance weights.

Since its inception, the Long Island has been raced at various distances:
 1 mile, 1 furlong : 1894–1910
 1 mile : 1972
  miles : 1973–1977
  miles : 1959, 1961, 1963–1967, 1970–1971
  miles : 1960, 1962, 1968–1969, 1989, 1997, 2000, 2018–2020
  miles: 1990–1996, 1998–1999, 2001–2017, 2021–present
  miles : 1956–1958

It was run in two divisions in 1958, 1962, 1967, 1969, 1970, 1972, 1974, 1985, 1990, and 1998.

Records 
Speed  record: (at current distance of  miles on turf)
 2:28.08 – Mutamakina (2021)

Most wins:
 2 – Parka (1964, 1965)
 2 – Hush Dear (1982, 1983)
 2 – Criticism (2008, 2009)
 2 – Mutamakina (2020, 2021)

Most wins by an owner:
 5 – Cragwood Stables (1967, 1969, 1970, 1974, 1976)

Most wins by a jockey:
 5 – Jorge Velásquez (1969, 1971, 1974, 1976, 1980)

Most wins by a trainer:
 5 – MacKenzie Miller (1967, 1969, 1970, 1974, 1976)

Winners of the Long Island Stakes

Winners of the Long Island Handicap at Sheepshead Bay

References

 June 29, 1894 New York Times article on Sir Walter winning the Long Island Handicap
 The 2009 Long Island Handicap at Bloodhorse.com

Graded stakes races in the United States
Grade 3 stakes races in the United States
Long-distance horse races for fillies and mares
Horse races in New York City
Turf races in the United States
Aqueduct Racetrack
Sheepshead Bay Race Track
Recurring sporting events established in 1894
1894 establishments in New York (state)